Vladimir Roslavlev (26 March 1880 Kharkiv – 1945 Germany) was an Estonian lawyer, economist and politician.

He wrote an explanation of the Stamp Tax Act with Rudolf Grünthal in 1929. He was a member of the Rahvuskogu and the Riigikogu from 1938 to 1940, in the Riigivolikogu branch, representing a number of parishes in Petseri County. 

He was later executed in 1945 by the Soviet Union.

References

1880 births
1945 deaths
People from Pechorsky District
Estonian people of Russian descent
Members of the Riigivolikogu
Members of the Estonian National Assembly
Estonian people executed by the Soviet Union
20th-century Estonian politicians